Habiganj-1 is a constituency represented in the Jatiya Sangsad (National Parliament) of Bangladesh since 2019 by Gazi Mohammad Shahnawaz of the Awami League.

Boundaries 
The constituency encompasses Bahubal and Nabiganj upazilas.

History 
The constituency was created in 1984 from the Sylhet-8 constituency when the former Sylhet District was split into four districts: Sunamganj, Sylhet, Moulvibazar, and Habiganj.

Ahead of the 2008 general election, the Election Commission redrew constituency boundaries to reflect population changes revealed by the 2001 Bangladesh census. The 2008 redistricting altered the boundaries of the constituency.

Members of Parliament

Elections

Elections in the 2010s 
Abdul Munim Chowdhury was elected unopposed in the 2014 general election after opposition parties withdrew their candidacies in a boycott of the election.

Dewan Farid Gazi died in November 2010. Sheikh Sujat Mia of the BNP was elected in a January 2011 by-election, defeating Awami League candidate Mushfiq Hussain Chowdhury and Jatiya Party (Ershad) candidate Abdul Munim Chowdhury.

Elections in the 2000s

Elections in the 1990s

References

External links
 

Parliamentary constituencies in Bangladesh
Habiganj District